Khlong Kum is a khwaeng (subdistrict) of Bueng Kum District, in Bangkok, Thailand. In 2020, it had a total population of 69,071 people.

References

Subdistricts of Bangkok
Bueng Kum district